James Glenn Jr. (born February 17, 1948) is a former Democratic member of the Kentucky House of Representatives.

Personal life
Jim Glenn was married to his wife Cornelia for 38 years, who died in June 2010. He currently resides in Owensboro and has two children: Kim and James III. Glenn is a devout Christian. Glenn obtained his BS from the University of Wisconsin-Superior in 1971, his MBA from the University of Wisconsin, Oshkosh in 1974, and his EdD from the University of Kentucky in 2001.

Career
Glenn is representing District 13 of Kentucky House since 2019. Glenn was also a candidate for Kentucky state Treasurer in the 2015 Democratic primary.

In 2018, Glenn made history by winning the Kentucky House race by just one vote.

References

External links
 Kentucky Legislature - Representative Jim Glenn
 Project Vote Smart - Representative Jim Glenn (MT) profile
 GLENN, JAMES (JIM) - FollowTheMoney.org

Democratic Party members of the Kentucky House of Representatives
1948 births
Living people
21st-century American politicians
Politicians from Birmingham, Alabama
Politicians from Owensboro, Kentucky
University of Wisconsin–Madison alumni
University of Kentucky alumni